Edward Garside (22 November 1904 – 8 August 1983) was an Australian rules footballer who played with Hawthorn in the Victorian Football League (VFL).

References

External links 

1904 births
1983 deaths
VFL/AFL players born outside Australia
Australian rules footballers from Victoria (Australia)
Hawthorn Football Club players
Sportspeople from Johannesburg